William Ross Laney (4 May 1913 – 7 August 1998) was a New Zealand Member of Parliament representing the Labour Party, and Mayor of Oamaru.

Biography

Early life and career
Laney was born in 1913 in Weston. He graduated from the University of Otago with a BA in 1937. He was also a New Zealand Universities rugby and cricket blue and later Otago rugby captain. Laney then became a teacher of agriculture at Waitaki Boys' High School.

Political career

Laney's political career began in 1951 when he was elected as a member of the Oamaru Borough Council in a by-election. He was then Mayor of Oamaru for 18 years from 1956 to 1974. From 1945 until 1956 he was an executive member of the Oamaru branch of the National Party but he resigned to join the Labour Party in order to contest the mayoralty. His resignation did not endear him to the local National Party faithful. This was compounded by the fact that the incumbent mayor he defeated, Michael Francis Edward Cooney, was a prominent member of the local National Party.

Laney was described as a man of integrity not prepared to compromise his principles and opposed the influence liquor industry lobbyists had over politicians during his time as an MP.

After losing his seat in Parliament Laney stood for the Oamaru mayoralty once again at the 1977 local elections, but was beaten by the deputy mayor Reginald James Denny by 1,415 votes.

Later life and death
In 1990 he was awarded the New Zealand 1990 Commemoration Medal.

Laney died on 7 August 1998 in Christchurch.

Notes

References

1913 births
1998 deaths
University of Otago alumni
Otago rugby union players
New Zealand National Party politicians
New Zealand Labour Party MPs
Mayors of Oamaru
Members of the New Zealand House of Representatives
New Zealand MPs for South Island electorates
Unsuccessful candidates in the 1975 New Zealand general election
Unsuccessful candidates in the 1978 New Zealand general election